Jacques-Gérard Milbert (18 November 1766 – 5 June 1840) was a French naturalist and artist.

Milbert was a pupil of the landscape painter Pierre-Henri de Valenciennes, and went on to teach drawing at the Parisian school of mines – the  – from 1795.

In 1800, Milbert embarked on Nicolas Baudin's voyage to Australia. During the voyage, Milbert and several other artists became ill, and the artists and the captain came into conflict. This caused several artists, including Milbert, to leave the voyage at Mauritius, leaving Charles-Alexandre Lesueur to produce the voyage's scientific drawings. Milbert returned to France, where in 1812 he published a series of views of Mauritius, the Cape Colony and Tenerife, titled , comprising two octavo volumes of text, and one quarto volume of plates.

In 1815, Milbert travelled to the United States, where he would remain for eight years, based in New York City, teaching, and travelling extensively in the northeastern United States.

Milbert returned to France on 20 October 1823, and began teaching, again at the school of mines. He published several further volumes, including drawings from his travels in the United States. He died on 5 June 1840.

References

External links

1766 births
1840 deaths
18th-century French painters
French male painters
19th-century French painters
French naturalists
Recipients of the Legion of Honour
19th-century French male artists
18th-century French male artists